Tabaré is an epic poem written by Uruguayan poet Juan Zorrilla de San Martín. 

Written in 1886, it was published for the first time in 1888. The poem comprises 4736 verses divided into 10 cantos. The love story between the aboriginal Tabaré and the Spaniard Blanca is a metaphor of the fate of the Charrúa people who originally inhabited the Banda Oriental.

References

External links
 Tabaré at WikiSource 

Uruguayan poems
Epic poems in Spanish
1888 poems
National personifications
Fictional indigenous people of the Americas
Fictional Uruguayan people